Nová Bošáca is a village and municipality in Nové Mesto nad Váhom District in the Trenčín Region of western Slovakia.

History
In historical records the village was first mentioned in 1950.

Geography
The municipality lies at an altitude of 301 metres and covers an area of 33.440 km². It has a population of about 1192 people.

References

External links

 Nová Bošáca - official page (in Slovak)
http://www.statistics.sk/mosmis/eng/run.html

Villages and municipalities in Nové Mesto nad Váhom District